Anita Klapote (born 5 September 1967) is a Latvian long-distance runner. She competed in the women's 10,000 metres at the 1992 Summer Olympics.

References

External links 
 
 
 
 
 

1967 births
Living people
Latvian female long-distance runners
Olympic athletes of Latvia
Athletes (track and field) at the 1992 Summer Olympics
Place of birth missing (living people)
Athletes from Riga